Auerbach is a municipality in the district Erzgebirgskreis, in Saxony, Germany. Auerbach has an area of 8.26 km² and a population of 2,897 (December 31, 2006).

References 

Erzgebirgskreis